David Lynch (born 1946) is an American film director.

David Lynch may also refer to:

David Lynch (Gaelic footballer), Westmeath player
David Lynch (wine expert), American writer and wine expert
David Lynch, American singer formerly with The Platters
David Lynch, co-founder of the American Front
Dave Lynch (1902–1958), Australian rules footballer

See also
David Lynch Scott (1845–1924), Canadian lawyer and judge